Admon Gilder Jr. (born November 14, 1995) is an American basketball player for Maccabi Haifa B.C. of the Israeli Liga Leumit. He played college basketball for the Texas A&M Aggies and the Gonzaga Bulldogs.

Early life and high school career
Gilder is the son of Admon Gilder Sr. and Paula Gilder, who is a breast cancer survivor. He began playing basketball at eight years old. He attended James Madison High School in Dallas, Texas, where he participated in basketball, cross country, and track and field. As a freshman, he averaged 15 points per game and earned District 11 3A freshman of the year honor. As a sophomore, Gilder averaged 22 points per game and led the team to a state title, being named District MVP. He led Madison to another state title as a junior and was named tournament MVP, averaging 26 points per game. He scored a career-high 43 points as a junior against Dallas Carville High School. As a senior, Gilder averaged 30.8 points, 9.6 rebounds, 4.8 assists, 3.4 steals and 1.4 blocks per game. He led Madison to a 25–8 record and a Class 4A state semifinal finish, earning recognition as the 2015 11-4A District MVP. Gilder was named Gatorade Texas Player of the Year.

Gilder was considered a four-star prospect by 247Sports, ESPN, Rivals, and Scout. He was a member of ESPN's Top 100 in the Class of 2015 and was ranked by ESPN as the sixth-best prospect in Texas as well as the No. 17 shooting guard. In November 2014, Gilder signed with Texas A&M over offers from Baylor, Oklahoma State and SMU.

College career
As a freshman, Gilder averaged 7.0 points and 2.3 rebounds per game, joining Tyler Davis and D. J. Hogg on a team that reached the Sweet 16. He averaged 13.7 points, 3.9 rebounds and 3.9 assists per game as a sophomore. Gilder averaged 12.3 points, 4.1 rebounds and 2.6 assists per game as a junior, helping Texas A&M reach the Sweet 16. He suffered a meniscus tear in December 2017, forcing him to miss five games. Coming into his senior season, Gilder was hampered by knee and hamstring injuries. He missed the 2018–19 season with a blood clot, forcing doctors to remove a rib. By the time he was cleared to play, coach Billy Kennedy had been fired. 

Gilder decided to transfer to Gonzaga for his final season of eligibility. He saw five straight double-figure scoring games to open the season, but his production declined and he was replaced in the starting lineup by Joël Ayayi. Despite battling knee issues, Gilder maintained his contributions to the team. He averaged 10.7 points per game for the Bulldogs.

Professional career
On June 24, 2021, Gilder signed with Lahti Basketball of the Finnish Korisliiga. On November 23, he signed with Spójnia Stargard of the Polish Basketball League (PLK).

Career statistics

College

|-
| style="text-align:left;"| 2015–16
| style="text-align:left;"| Texas A&M
| 37 || 0 || 20.4 || .431 || .347 || .761 || 2.3 || 1.3 || .9 || .1 || 7.0
|-
| style="text-align:left;"| 2016–17
| style="text-align:left;"| Texas A&M
| 31 || 29 || 34.6 || .429 || .377 || .743 || 3.9 || 3.9 || 1.9 || .3 || 13.7
|-
| style="text-align:left;"| 2017–18
| style="text-align:left;"| Texas A&M
| 30 || 29 || 32.0 || .458 || .395 || .821 || 4.1 || 2.6 || 1.2 || .2 || 12.3
|-
| style="text-align:left;"| 2018–19
| style="text-align:left;"| Texas A&M
| style="text-align:center;" colspan="11"|  Redshirt
|-
| style="text-align:left;"| 2019–20
| style="text-align:left;"| Gonzaga
| 33 || 10 || 25.6 || .429 || .363 || .760 || 2.8 || 2.0 || 1.1 || .3 || 10.7
|- class="sortbottom"
| style="text-align:center;" colspan="2"| Career
| 131 || 68 || 27.7 || .437 || .371 || .770 || 3.2 || 2.4 || 1.3 || .2 || 10.7

Personal life
Gilder is the son of Admon Gilder Sr. and Paula Gilder. He has a brother, Y'kendrick; a sister, Teamber; and a daughter, Kailey. He is the first person in his immediate family to graduate from college.

References

External links
Gonzaga Bulldogs bio
Texas A&M Aggies bio

1995 births
Living people
American men's basketball players
American expatriate basketball people in Poland
American expatriate basketball people in Finland
Basketball players from Dallas
Gonzaga Bulldogs men's basketball players
Parade High School All-Americans (boys' basketball)
Shooting guards
Spójnia Stargard players
Texas A&M Aggies men's basketball players